Steeplegate Mall is an enclosed shopping mall in Concord, New Hampshire, United States. Opened in 1990, it has struggled with high vacancy rates throughout its existence. Its largest retailer is JCPenney, the only traditional store left alongside Talbots and Chico's. It also features a live theater that opened in 2016, a trampoline park that opened in 2018, and a health club that opened in 2019.

The mall opened with four large retail anchor stores, a food court  with a  mosaic, and room for about 62 storefronts, depending on layout. Following the interior's closure on April 22, 2022, after the mall's owners evicted the few remaining interior-only businesses for a potential overhaul, only six businesses with exterior entrances are open.

History
The  mall opened August 1, 1990, with Sears, JCPenney, Sage-Allen and Steinbach as its anchors. It was built by Homart Development Company.

Steinbach closed its store in 1999 as part of the company's bankruptcy. Sage-Allen, which closed in Fall 1992 and remained vacant for almost 7 years, became The Bon-Ton in 1999, with a second Bon-Ton and Circuit City splitting the former Steinbach. Circuit City liquidated and closed in 2009.

Decline

In 2011, General Growth Properties, the successor company to Homart, transferred ownership of the mall, along with 29 other underperforming malls, to its Rouse Properties subsidiary. In August 2014, Rouse Properties announced that it had defaulted on its loan for Steeplegate Mall and was in the process of turning over the property to its lenders. By April 2015 the property was owned by a consortium of lenders including Wells Fargo Bank and Midland Loan Servicing and managed by Colliers International.

In January 2015, Old Navy, one of four main anchors at the mall, closed its doors.

In May 2016, Steeplegate Mall was bought by the New York-based Namdar Realty Group for $10.4 million.

As part of an attempt to diversify from traditional retail and food stores, Hatbox Theater, a live theater venue located in the former Coldwater Creek and using the adjoining former RadioShack space for storage and rehearsals, opened in 2016. Similarly, VIP Bounce Houses and Laser Tag opened in the former Old Navy location that year.

In April 2018, Bon-Ton closed both of its stores as part of a plan to close 42 stores nationwide. Later that same year, a charter school called Capital City Charter School moved into the former Bon-Ton men's clothing and houseware store, although it closed and filed for bankruptcy in 2021, while an Altitude Trampoline Park franchise opened within the former Circuit City space in November.

In 2019, a health club called The Zoo opened a franchise in the former Bon-Ton women's and children's store, marking the first time since Circuit City's closure that all five anchors in the mall had an active permanent tenant. In 2019, one of the mall's oldest tenants, a confectionery called True Confections Candies & Gifts, moved out of the mall, citing declining foot traffic and the mall owners' unwillingness to lower rent rates.

On February 6, 2020, Sears closed the Steeplegate store as part of closing 96 stores nationwide, which left JCPenney as the only traditional anchor. The former Sears store was used as a state vaccination site during the COVID-19 pandemic.

Mall interior closes for overhaul

In February 2022, the mall's owners told the five remaining businesses that were only accessible from inside the mall to vacate their spaces by March 2022 for upcoming unspecified changes to the mall's interior. The same month, the owners also told the Hatbox Theatre, which only had an exterior entrance, that it had until March 13 to vacate the spaces it used. However, the owners renounced their demands shortly afterward and allowed the theater to stay, although Hatbox was no longer permitted to use the adjoining former RadioShack space. By April 2022, all of the last five interior-only businesses vacated the mall; four of them moved to other locations—three to elsewhere in Concord and one to Hooksett—while the fifth decided to close permanently. On April 22, the mall closed its interior to visitors, leaving only the six remaining businesses with exterior entrances—JCPenney, Talbots, Chico's, Hatbox Theatre, The Zoo Health Club, and Altitude Trampoline Park.

Gallery

References

External links

Shopping malls established in 1990
Buildings and structures in Concord, New Hampshire
Tourist attractions in Concord, New Hampshire
Shopping malls in New Hampshire
1990 establishments in New Hampshire
Namdar Realty Group